My Wife, the Director General (translit.Miraty Modir 'Am) is a 1966 Egyptian Comedy film directed by Fatin Abdel Wahab. It stars Salah Zulfikar and Shadia. The film is listed in the Top 100 Egyptian films of the 20th century.

Plot
Hussein Omar, the head of the projects department, is surprised by the transfer of his wife, Ismat Fahmy, as the general manager of the construction company he works for. This stems from many paradoxes from his co-workers and the different temperament of his wife in dealing with him at work from home.

Cast
 Salah Zulfikar as Hussein Omar
 Shadia as Ismat Fahmy
 Tawfik El Deken as Abou El Khir Hassanein
Yousuf Shaaban as the director's secretary
 Shafik Nour El Din as Abdel 'Awy 
 Cariman as Aida
El Deif Ahmed as Hotel waiter
 Adel Emam as Abou El Magd

See also
 Cinema of Egypt
 Lists of Egyptian films
Salah Zulfikar filmography
 List of Egyptian films of the 1960s

References

External links

1966 films
1960s Arabic-language films
1966 comedy films
Egyptian comedy films
Films directed by Fatin Abdel Wahab